Cayenne – Félix Eboué Airport is French Guiana's main international airport. It is managed by the Chamber of Commerce and Industry of French Guiana (CCI Guyane).

Air Guyane Express has its headquarters on the airport property.

History 
The first airfield at Cayenne, called "Gallion," was built in 1943 in ten months by the U.S. Army Air Corps as a base allowing bombers to reach Africa. Though quickly abandoned upon the completion of the new airport, it can still be found very close to the aerodrome.

The new airport was first given the name "Rochambeau" in reference to Jean-Baptiste Donatien de Vimeur, comte de Rochambeau, commander-in-chief of the French troops in the American Revolutionary War. It was purchased by France in 1949.

This name was controversial because the airport's namesake's son, Donatien-Marie-Joseph de Vimeur, vicomte de Rochambeau, harshly repressed the Haitian Revolution during the Saint-Domingue expedition. Christiane Taubira, then-Member of the National Assembly of France for Guiana, requested in 1999 that the name be changed. Multiple proposals were submitted, including Cépérou, a seventeenth-century indigenous chief. It was finally renamed Félix Éboué Airport in 2012, the change becoming official in January of that year. The code for the airport remains CAY.

Félix Eboué Airport serves approximately 400,000 passengers per year.

Facilities
It has one paved runway. It is open to public air traffic and international air traffic.

Airlines and destinations

Statistics

See also
 Transport in French Guiana
 List of airports in French Guiana

References

External links

 CCI Guyane 
 
 
 

Airports in French Guiana
Buildings and structures in Matoury